Ivan Passer (10 July 1933 – 9 January 2020) was a Czech film director and screenwriter, best known for his involvement in the Czechoslovak New Wave and for directing American films such as Born to Win (1971), Cutter's Way (1981) and Stalin (1992).

Life and career
Passer was born in Prague, the son of Marianna (Mandelick) and Alois Passer. Passer attended King George boarding school in Poděbrady with future filmmakers Miloš Forman, Jerzy Skolimowski and Paul Fierlinger and playwright Václav Havel. He then studied at FAMU in Prague, but did not finish the program. He began his career as an assistant director on Ladislav Helge's Velká samota.

Later he collaborated with his friend Forman on all of Forman's Czech films, including Loves of a Blonde (1965) and The Firemen's Ball (1967), both of which Passer co-wrote and which were nominated for Academy Awards. He introduced Forman to cinematographer Miroslav Ondříček whom he knew from Velká samota. He then directed his first feature, Intimate Lighting, which was released in 1965 and is considered by some to be Passer's masterpiece.

In 1969, after the Warsaw Pact invasion, Passer and Forman left Czechoslovakia together. Both proceeded to the United States, with Forman becoming an Academy Award-winning filmmaker. Passer went on to make several prominent American films such as Born to Win (1971), a junkie drama starring George Segal and Karen Black, and Cutter's Way (1981), a dramatic thriller starring Jeff Bridges and John Heard.

Though best known for his idiosyncratic, often gritty dramas, he also directed comedies such as Silver Bears (1978) starring Michael Caine and Creator (1985) starring Peter O'Toole. Later in his career, he directed numerous films for television, most notably the award-winning biopic Stalin (1992) starring Robert Duvall for HBO. He was also a film professor at the University of Southern California.

Passer died on January 9, 2020, from pulmonary complications in Reno, Nevada. He was 86 years old.

Filmography
Audition (1963) (co-writer only, with Miloš Forman, Jaroslav Papoušek and Václav Šašek)
Intimate Lighting (1965) (also co-writer, with Jaroslav Papoušek and Václav Šašek)
Loves of a Blonde (1965) (co-writer only, with Miloš Forman, Jaroslav Papoušek and Václav Šašek)
The Firemen's Ball (1967) (co-writer only, with Miloš Forman, Jaroslav Papoušek and Václav Šašek)
Born to Win (1971) (also co-writer, with David Scott Milton)
Law and Disorder (1974) (also co-writer, with Kenneth Harris Fishman and William Richert)
Crime and Passion (1976) (also co-writer, with William Richert)
Silver Bears (1977)
Cutter's Way (1981)
Faerie Tale Theatre (1983) (director of episode "The Nightingale")
Creator (1985)
Haunted Summer (1988)
Fourth Story (1990)
Stalin (1992)
While Justice Sleeps (1994)
Kidnapped (1995)
The Wishing Tree (1999)
Picnic (2000)
Velvet Hangover (2000)
Nomad: The Warrior (2006)

References

External links

1933 births
2020 deaths
Czechoslovak defectors
Czechoslovak film directors
Film directors from Prague
Czechoslovak emigrants to the United States
Respiratory disease deaths in Nevada
Deaths from lung disease